The Separation is the 32nd book in the Animorphs series, written by K.A. Applegate. It is narrated by the two "halves" of Rachel. This is the only numerical book written by Applegate, and not a ghostwriter, between #26 and #53.

Plot summary

On a field trip to the beach, Rachel is exploring tide pools when she loses an earring in the water. Wishing to get it back she comes across a starfish, acquires it, and morphs into it, retrieving the earring. Unfortunately, before she can demorph, a child chops her in half. Thanks to the regenerative properties of starfish, Rachel does not die; instead, in the shock of being sliced in two, both halves demorph, resulting in two Rachels - Mean Rachel and Nice Rachel.

Mean Rachel is violent, aggressive, and despises all forms of "weakness" - weakness including most feelings, and any attitudes towards enemies other than homicidal hatred. She is totally incapable of planning ahead, making her useless in anything other than a direct combat situation, and believes that she is always right. This leads her to try to kill Marco and Jake, and take control of the Animorphs. In contrast, Nice Rachel is totally passive, easily frightened, and is too scared to morph. She cannot fight, making herself a liability in battle, although she is good at making plans. Both Rachels are actively dangerous towards the secrecy and long-term survival of the Animorphs, and the rest of the Animorphs must find a way to combine them back into Normal Rachel.

Jake convinces Nice Rachel to come with him to follow a Yeerk truck. It turns out to be a trap, and Jake and Nice Rachel are put in boxes to await the arrival of Visser Three. Mean Rachel follows them in an attempt to kill Jake and Nice Rachel. Jake pretends to be dead, forcing Mean and Nice Rachel to work together in order to escape the trap. Nice Rachel makes the plan and Mean Rachel actually does it, flying into Visser Three's ear canal while morphed and threatening to demorph, killing both of them. All three escape unharmed.

After they escape safely, Nice and Mean Rachel finally realize that they need to be together to work well and Erek King helps make them back into one whole Rachel again by morphing into each other while touching. After Rachel is returned to normal, she realises that it is both sides of her personality that make her who she is, and vows to try not to become either of the two.

Morphs

Separation, The
1999 American novels
1999 science fiction novels